Gonda Junction railway station is a railway station in Devipatan division, Gonda district, Uttar Pradesh. Its code is GD. It serves Gonda city. The station consists of five platforms.

Loco Shed 

Diesel Loco Shed, Gonda was established in year 1982 with a small holding of 22 WDM-1 locomotives. In the past 31 years, it has witnessed many technological changes and has emerged one of the major diesel shed for maintenance of BG locomotives. Gonda shed has distinction of maintaining wide range of rolling stocks starting from WDM-1 locomotives, YDM4 locomotives, shunting locomotives, AC/DC WDM-2 locomotives, WDM2 -2600 HP, WDM3A-3100 HP locomotives and latest WDM-3D3300 HP locomotives and high adhesion WDG-3A locomotive. As of date, Diesel shed is homing 181 BG locomotives against the berthing capacity of 130 locos. Diesel shed had also extended technical assistance to Chhapra Satellite Shed.
Diesel shed Gonda is also maintaining the 140 Ton crane stabled at GKP.

Shed Loco Holdings -
WDM-3A – 3 locos,
WDS-6 – 04 locos,
WAG-7 -80
 WAP-4 - 53
 WAP 7 - 17
 WAG 9 - 5
 WAG 5 - 4
 WAP 1 - 15

Total-- 181

References 

Railway stations in Gonda district
Lucknow NER railway division
Gonda, Uttar Pradesh
Transport in Gonda, Uttar Pradesh